Robert Newman was the member of Parliament for Malmesbury in the parliaments of January 1397 and 1399, and Cricklade in May 1413.

References 

Members of the Parliament of England (pre-1707) for Cricklade
English MPs January 1397
English MPs 1399
Year of birth unknown
Year of death unknown
Members of the Parliament of England for Malmesbury
English MPs May 1413